Hyderabad Colony is a residential neighborhood of Gulshan Town, Karachi, Sindh, Pakistan. 

Hyderabad Colony was originally inhabited by the Hyderabadi Muslim migrants from Hyderabad Deccan, India.

It is famous for its popular Hyderabadi food, including Hyderabadi biryani, chaakna, Hyderabad Haleem and especially achar (pickle). Abu Mian, a catering service popular among the Hyderabadis of Karachi, is located in Hyderabad Colony.

References

External links 
 Hyderabad, India on Encyclopedia Britannica

Neighbourhoods of Karachi
Gulshan Town